Hamzah Hussain (sometimes spelt as Hamzah Hussein or Hamzah Husin) (born 8 August 1948) is a former football player who represented the Malaysian national football team in the 1970s. He played for Kelantan FA, Pahang FA and Selangor FA in Malaysia Cup competition.

A midfielder, Hamzah played for the Malaysia team in the 1972 Munich Olympics football competition, playing all three group games. He also played for Malaysia in tournaments across Asia such as Merdeka Tournament. He retired from international tournaments in 1974. In 2004, he was inducted in Olympic Council of Malaysia's Hall of Fame for 1972 Summer Olympics football team.

Hamzah was a prison officer at Prison Department of Malaysia, his final rank before retiring from prison force was Deputy Superintendent of Prison.

Honours
Kelantan
 Malaysia Cup runner-up: 1970
 Malaysia FAM Cup runner-up: 1971

Malaysia
 Merdeka Cup: 1973

References

External links
 Profile at Sports Council, Prison Department of Malaysia
 Profile at Fifa.com
 

1948 births
Malaysian footballers
Malaysia international footballers
Malaysian people of Malay descent
People from Kelantan
Kelantan FA players
Sri Pahang FC players
Selangor FA players
Olympic footballers of Malaysia
Footballers at the 1972 Summer Olympics
Living people
Association football midfielders